is a Japanese manga series by Takuto Kashiki. It has been serialized since 2011 in Enterbrain's seinen manga magazine Fellows!, which was renamed to Harta in 2013. It has been collected in eleven tankōbon volumes. A 12-episode anime television series adaptation by Lerche aired from January 12 to March 30, 2018. An original video animation was included on the second Blu-ray/DVD volume released on June 27, 2018. Sentai Filmworks licensed the anime.

Synopsis
In a mystical forest in a world inhabited by people only a few inches tall and talking animals, the relaxed story focuses on the daily lives and adventures of two of those tiny women living together in a house in a tree; the tomboyish Hakumei and serene, ladylike Mikochi.

Characters

One of the protagonists, red-haired and energetic. She is a diligent and skilled craftswoman, but tends to get herself and others in dangerous situations nonetheless. She was homeless and on her own, before moving in with Mikochi, in the town of Makinata.

The dark-haired protagonist. She is a well-respected cook and prepares food and other goods to be sold in a nearby store.

A songstress who befriends Mikochi.

A researcher who uses animated skeletons to work for her.

A weasel and Hakumei's senior colleague.
Kobone Master

Owner-manager of a café/pub frequented by Mikochi and Hakumei.

Media

Manga

Anime
A 12-episode anime television series adaptation by Lerche aired in Japan from January 12 to March 30, 2018. It is directed by Masaomi Andō and with series composition by Reiko Yoshida. The opening theme is "urar" by Chima, and the ending theme is "Harvest Moon Night" performed by voice actresses Shino Shimoji (Mikochi) and Aoi Yūki (Konju). Ending theme lyrics are unique to each episode referring to the episode's plot. Sentai Filmworks licensed the anime and streamed it on Hidive. The English dub was released on March 19, 2019.

Notes

References

External links
 

2018 anime OVAs
Anime series based on manga
Enterbrain manga
Kadokawa Dwango franchises
Fantasy anime and manga
Iyashikei anime and manga
Lerche (studio)
Seinen manga
Sentai Filmworks
Yen Press titles